The 1992–93 Wills Trophy (named after sponsor Wills of ITC Limited) was a One Day International (ODI) cricket tri-series where the United Arab Emirates played host to Pakistan, Sri Lanka and Zimbabwe. Pakistan and Sri Lanka reached the final, which Pakistan won. India were invited to join the competition, but declined in protest at the umpiring in the 1991–92 competition.

Points Table

Group matches

First match

Second match

Third match

Final

References

International cricket competitions from 1991–92 to 1994
One Day International cricket competitions
ITC Limited